was the 12th shōgun of the Tokugawa shogunate of Japan.<ref name="hall21">Hall, John Whitney et al. (1991).  Early Modern Japan',' p. 21.]</ref>

Biography
Ieyoshi was born as the second son of the 11th shōgun, Tokugawa Ienari and named Toshijirō (敏次郎). Toshijirō was appointed heir on the death of his elder brother, Takechiyo. He became shogun on September 2, 1837, at the age of 45 upon the retirement of his father, Tokugawa Ienari. However, Ienari continued to wield much power from behind the throne, and it was not until after his death in 1841 that Senior Rōjū Mizuno Tadakuni was able to purge the government of his clique, and to implement measures to overhaul the shogunate's finances and controls in the aftermath of the Great Tenpō Famine of 1832–36.

Known as the Tenpō Reforms, these numerous sumptuary laws attempted to stabilize the economy through a return to the frugality, simplicity and discipline that were characteristic of the early Edo period, by banning most forms of entertainment and displays of wealth. The restrictions proved extremely unpopular with the commoners.

Increasing criticism of the government's handling of foreign affairs led to the Bansha no goku in 1839, suppressing rangaku studies.

Another part of the Reform included the Agechi-rei of 1843, which was to have daimyō in the vicinity of Edo and Ōsaka surrender their holdings for equal amounts of land elsewhere, thereby consolidating Tokugawa control over these strategically vital areas. However, this was also greatly unpopular amongst daimyō of all ranks and income levels. 
To complicate the situation further, in May 1844, Edo Castle burned down, and Mizuno Tadakuni was forced into exile and retirement. Mizuno was replaced by Doi Yoshitsura, Abe Masahiro and Tsutsui Masanori as rōjū.
He forced the retirement of Tokugawa Nariaki in 1844 and placed Nariaki's seventh son, Tokugawa Yoshinobu as head of the Hitotsubashi-Tokugawa house in 1847. He also forced the retirement of Shimazu Narioki in 1851.

US Commodore Matthew Perry arrived on June 3, 1853, on a mission to force a treaty opening Japan to trade. Ieyoshi died on July 27, 1853, before the treaty could be concluded, of heart failure possibly brought on by heat stroke, and was succeeded by his third son Tokugawa Iesada. The following year the Tokugawa shogunate was forced to accept the American demands by signing the Convention of Kanagawa.

Tokugawa Ieyoshi's grave is at the Tokugawa family mausoleum at Zōjō-ji in Shiba. His buddhist name was Shintokuin.

Family
Ieyoshi's official wife was Princess Takako (1795–1840), the sixth daughter of Prince Arisugawa Orihito. She relocated to Edo Castle in 1804 when she was only age 10, and they were formally wed in 1810. In 1813, she gave birth to a son, Takechiyo, followed by a daughter in 1815 and in 1816.  In addition, Ieyoshi had another 13 sons and 11 daughters by numerous concubines; however, only one son, Tokugawa Iesada, lived past the age of 20.

 Father: Tokugawa Ienari
 Mother: Oraku no Kata (d.1810) later Korin'in
 Wife: Arisugawa Takako (1795–1840) later Jokan-in
 Concubine:
 Ohana no Kata (d. 1844)
 Okane no Kata (d. 1843) later Mi-ko-in
 Ofude no Kata (d. 1844) later Shumyo-in
 Omitsu no Kata (1807–1885) later Hojuin
 Okoto no Kata (d. 1855) later Myoon'in
 Otsuyu no Kata (d. 1888) later Shugetsuin
 Okaju no Kata (1803–1826) later Myoka-in
 Ohisa no Kata (d. 1847) later Seiryo-in
 Children:
 Takechiyo (1813–1814) born by Takako
 Tatsuhime (1814–1818) by Okaju
 Tomohime (1815-1815) born by Takako
 Saigen-in (1816-1816) born by Takako
 Yochiyo (1819–1820) by Ohisa
 Entsuin (1822-1822) by Okaju
 Tokugawa Iesada born by Omitsu
 Maihime (1824–1829) born by Ohana
 Tokugawa Yoshimasa (1825–1838) of Hitotsubashi-Tokugawa Family born by Ohisa
 Teruhime (1826–1840) married Tokugawa Yoshiyori and later known as Teimei-in born by Ohisa
 Hanhime (1826-1826) by Okaju
 Tokugawa Harunojo (1826–1827) by Omitsu
 Tokugawa Atsugoro (1828–1829) by Omitsu
 Tokugawa Jikimaru (1829–1830) by Ofude
 Tokugawa Ginnojo (1832–1833) by Ofude
 Satohime (1833–1834) by Okane
 Chiehime (1835–1836) by Ofude
 Yoshihime (1836–1837) by Okane
 Tokugawa Kamegoro (1838–1839) by Ofude
 Maijihime (1839–1840) by Okane
 Wakahime (1842–1843) by Okane
 Shoyo-in (1843-1843) by Okane
 Okuhime (1844–1845) by Okoto
 Tokugawa Tadashimaru (1845–1846) by Okoto
 Shikihime (1848-1848) by Okoto
 Sashin-in (1849-1849) by Otsuyu
 Tokugawa Choyoshiro (1852–1853) by Okoto
 Adopted daughters:
 Itonomiya Takako (1835–1856) married Tokugawa Yoshiatsu of Mito Domain had 1 daughter, Namahime (b. 1854) married Hachisuka Mochiaki
 Akinomiya Akiko (1825–1913) married Arima Yorishige of Kurume Domain

Events of Ieyoshi's bakufu
 1837 (Tenpō 7): Tokugawa Ieyoshi becomes the 12th shōgun of the bakufu government.
 1844 (Kōka 1): Era name changed due to fire which destroyed Edo Castle
 1846 (Kōka 3): Kōmei becomes 121st Emperor of Japan.
1847 (Kōka 4): Zenkoji earthquake causes major damage in Shinano Province and surrounding areas
1848 (Kaei 1): Era name changed to acknowledge the beginning of the reign of the Emperor Kōmei
 1853 (Kaei 6): Arrival of U.S. Commodore Matthew C. Perry and his fleet of Black Ships.

Eras of Ieyoshi's bakufu
The years in which Ieyoshi was shōgun are more specifically identified by more than one era name or nengō.
 Tenpō  (1830–1844)
 Kōka         (1844–1848)
 Kaei         (1848–1854)

Ancestry

Notes

References
 Bolitho, Harold. (1974). Treasures Among Men: The Fudai Daimyo in Tokugawa Japan.'' New Haven: Yale University Press.  ; [https://www.worldcat.org/oclc/185685588  OCLC 185685588
 Hall, John Whitney and Marius Jansen. (1991).  Early Modern Japan: The Cambridge History of Japan. Cambridge: Cambridge University Press. ; OCLC 62064695
 Screech, Timon. (2006).  Secret Memoirs of the Shoguns:  Isaac Titsingh and Japan, 1779–1822. London: RoutledgeCurzon. 
 Totman, Conrad. (1967).  Politics in the Tokugawa bakufu, 1600–1843. Cambridge: Harvard University Press.  OCLC 279623

External links
 National Archives of Japan:  Illustrations of Road to Nikko, Tempo 14 (1843)

1793 births
1853 deaths
18th-century Japanese people
19th-century shōguns
Tokugawa shōguns
Tokugawa clan